Catch Without Arms is the third album from the Los Gatos, CA rock band Dredg, released on June 21, 2005. The album signifies a change to a simpler, and more straightforward musical style for the band.

Background and release
Lead singer Gavin Hayes comments on his lyrical approach to this album, saying, "The whole underlying basis of the lyrics and the music is opposites, contrasts... I’d written some lyrics that are based around conversations or arguments, so we thought about a record with two halves that contrast each other. The whole basis of the record could be about objection to ideas, and contrast."

The album was released with a booklet containing art created by Dredg bassist, Drew Roulette and lead singer, Gavin Hayes. Initially there was an original painting created for each song and two others, a total of 14 paintings, in the Catch Without Arms Collection.  These paintings, while abstract in nature, all contain elements directly and indirectly related to the song they portray.  The artwork not only was an accompaniment to the album, but also the map to a treasure.  Over several weeks, various clues were posted on the official Dredg website that were meant to point users to a buried treasure of sorts.  Once the treasure was found, another hunt began for the three people who found the original treasure.

Catch Without Arms was produced by Terry Date, who had produced multiple Soundgarden, Pantera, Deftones, and Limp Bizkit albums. Former Queensrÿche guitarist Chris DeGarmo worked with the band on production and arrangement of the album. DeGarmo also shares writing credits on two tracks.

Track listing

Part 1

Part 2

Bonus track

Personnel

 Gavin Hayes – Vocals
 Terry Date – Producer, Engineer, Mixing
 Chris DeGarmo – Arranger
 Ingrid Erickson – Editing
 Benny Gordon – A&R
 Sam Hofstedt – Engineer, Assistant, Pro-Tools
 Ted Jensen – Mastering
 Scott Olson – Engineer, Pro-Tools
 Floyd Reitsman – Engineer, Assistant, Pro-Tools
 Kelly Sato – Marketing Coordinator
 Les Scurry – Production Coordination
 Mark Williams – A&R

Music videos
 "Bug Eyes"

Other songs
 "Uplifting News" 3:22 (released on import/non U.S. editions of Catch Without Arms)
 "Stationary Transient" 3:59 (released on the Bug Eyes 7" Vinyl)
 "Stone By Stone" 3:56 (released on a bonus CD with issue 150 of the German magazine, Visions, in Sept. 2005)

Artwork
These are the paintings released by the band, all painted by Drew Roulette and Gavin Hayes, for each of the album tracks and two additional paintings included in the Catch Without Arms Collection:
 "Ode To The Sun" - "Outline & Color"
 "Bug Eyes" - "Grace & Seriousness"
 "Catch Without Arms" - "Freedom & Order"
 "Not That Simple" - "Depth & Surface"
 "Zebraskin" - "Truth & Imagination"
 "The Tanbark Is Hot Lava" - "Logic & Emotion"
 "Sang Real (#1)" "Sang Real (#2)" - "Oneness & Manyness".
 "Planting Seeds" - "Sameness & Difference"
 "Spitshine" - "Impersonal & Personal"
 "Jamais Vu" - "Light & Dark"
 "Hung Over On A Tuesday" - "Heaviness & Lightness"
 "Matroshka" - "Universe & Object"

References

External links
 
 Analysis of Catch Without Arms

Dredg albums
2005 albums
Albums produced by Terry Date
Interscope Records albums